Vilcún Agromanzun Airport  is a public use airport located  west-southwest of Vilcún, La Araucanía, Chile.

See also
List of airports in Chile

References

External links 
 Airport record for Vilcún Agromanzun Airport at Landings.com

Airports in Chile
Airports in La Araucanía Region